Brindley & Foster was a pipe organ builder based in Sheffield who flourished between 1854 and 1939.

Background

The business was established by Charles Brindley in 1854. He was joined by Albert Healey Foster in 1871 and the company acquired the name Brindley & Foster.

Charles Brindley was born in Baslow, Derbyshire, in the early 1830s. He retired in 1887 and died in 1893.

Brindley was a follower of Edmund Schulze. He built solid instruments with powerful choruses using Vogler’s Simplification system. Pipes placed in chromatic order on the soundboards allowed for a simple and reliable key action and permitted similar stops to share the same bass, keeping both space and cost to a minimum. The Swell organ was often mounted above the Great in the German manner.

After the partnership with Foster they began to manufacture more complex pneumatic mechanisms for stop combinations; he also concentrated on the production of orchestral effects.

The business of Brindley and Foster was bought by Henry Willis & Sons in 1939.

List of new organs
Mechanics' Institute, Launceston, Tasmania, Australia 1859. Moved to Albert Hall, Launceston 1891. Rebuilt 1961. Water organ.
St Anne's Church, Baslow 1865
Holy Trinity, Ashby-de-la-Zouch 1867
Market Rasen Wesleyan Church 1867
All Saints' Church, Wingerworth 1867
St Andrew's Church, Heckington 1869
All Saints' Church, Glossop 1871
All Saints' Church, Oakham 1872
St Paul's Church, Leicester 1873
St Mary's Church, Carleton-in-Craven 1875
St Andrew's Church, Keighley, West Yorkshire 1876? (Organ re-built 1955 Wm Hill, Norman & Beard Ltd., with only a very few minor tonal changes and re-siting of the Choir Organ on the opposite side of the chancel. Tonally still very much Charles Brindley)
St Mary's Church, Arnold 1876
Anglican Church of Jesus Christ, Saint Petersburg, Russia. 1877 -organ non working.
St John's Church, Ranmoor, Sheffield 1877 – destroyed by fire 1887
Worksop Priory 1879
St Edmund’s Church, Castleton, Derbyshire 1881
St Thomas' Church, Derby 1881
St Peter and St Paul's Church, Old Brampton 1882
St Peter's Church, Hope 1883
All Saint's Parish Church, Bakewell, Derbyshire 1883
Saint Mark's Anglican, Alexandria, Egypt 1883
Airlie Parish Kirk, Kirkton of Airlie, Angus, 1884. Moved to Isla Parishes Church, Kilry, Angus 2014.
Peel New Church (since 1980 St German's Cathedral, Isle of Man). 1884
St Andrew's Anglican Church, Moscow. 1885 -destroyed 1917
Montrose Old Church, Forfarshire. 1885
All Saints' Cathedral, Bathurst, New South Wales, Australia 1886
St John's Church, Ranmoor, Sheffield 1888
St John the Baptist Church, Mexborough 1899
Lesmahagow Old Parish Church 1889
Wallacetown Parish Church, Dundee, Scotland. 1891. Destroyed by fire in 1955. 
Wesley Memorial Methodist Church, Epworth 1891. Restored in 2015 by Aistrup & Hind, organ builders of Lincoln. It was also enlarged by adding 4 new speaking stops. 
Pietermaritzburg City Hall, Pietermaritzburg, South Africa 1893.  The City Hall and organ were destroyed by fire in 1898, and subsequently rebuilt.
Durban City Hall, Durban, South Africa, 1894
St Mary's Wesleyan Methodist Church, Truro 1895
Holy Sepulchre Anglican Church, Grafton, Auckland, New Zealand 1896 (rebuilt with new slider soundboards by Norman & Beard 1913, but remains tonally the same.)
St John's Church, Worksop 1896
St Laurence's Church, Long Eaton 1896
St Mary's Church, Wirksworth 1899
St Mark's Church, Mansfield 1900
Pietermaritzburg City Hall, Pietermaritzburg, South Africa 1901 – one of the largest pipe organs in the Southern Hemisphere, and the largest organ produced by Brindley and Foster. This organ replaced the original 1893 organ, which was destroyed by fire in 1898. Extensively renovated in 1976 to change from pneumatic to electrical action with a movable Walker console.
Chalmers' Presbyterian Church, Timaru, New Zealand 1903
St Mary Lowgate, Kingston upon Hull 1904
St Mary's Church, Copythorne 1905
Ficksburg Dutch Reformed Church, Ficksburg, South Africa 1907
St John the Baptist's Church, Ault Hucknall 1905
Holy Trinity Church, Lenton 1906
Toxteth Unitarian Chapel 1906
St Anne's Church, Moseley 1907
St Peter's Church, Ruddington 1908
Christ Church, Chester 1909
St Paul and St John the Evangelist, Monklands, Airdrie, North Lanarkshire, Scotland – Installed & dedicated 1911 and the only addition made to the original design, was the addition of a Tremolo Stop at some point. The instrument was restored in 1998,and is in original condition and retaining the original hand pump, which can still be used today if there is a power cut.
St Giles' Church, Balderton 1912
Church of the Ascension, Maltby 1912 (approx) now relocated in Goldthorpe
Sacred Heart Church, Roscommon, Ireland 1912
St Mary and St Laurence's Church, Bolsover 1921
St Inacio de Loiola Parish, São Paulo, Brazil 1925, opus 2714, 2 manuals, pedal, 13 stops. The only original Brindley organ in America. It was built for the Anglican Church in Niterói, Rio de Janeiro. The organ was restored and installed at St Inacio 
 All Saints' Church, Misterton, Notts

List of works of restorations and renovations

St Mary's, Staines 1871 (probable renovation)
All Saints Church, Bakewell 1883
St Mary's Church, Tickhill 1898
St Paul and St John the Evangelist (Monklands), Springwells Avenue, Airdrie, Scotland 1998
Breaston Methodist Church 1927 later transferred to Whitchurch Methodist Church, Cardiff 1992

References

Pipe organ building companies
Organ builders of the United Kingdom
Manufacturing companies established in 1854
Defunct companies based in Sheffield
Manufacturing companies based in Sheffield
Musical instrument manufacturing companies of the United Kingdom
1854 establishments in England
Manufacturing companies disestablished in 1939
1939 disestablishments in England